Beuzec-Cap-Sizun is a commune in the Finistère department of Brittany in north-western France, lying on the promontory of Cap Sizun.

Population
Inhabitants of Beuzec-Cap-Sizun are called Beuzecois in French.

See also
Communes of the Finistère department

References

External links

 Mayors of Finistère Association  ;

Communes of Finistère
Populated coastal places in France